Esin Alpogan, (born 9 May 1979), is a Turkish thespian, movie and tv series actress.

Life and career 
Esin Alpogan, was born on 9 May 1979 in Ankara. She is the daughter of diplomat Yiğit Alpogan who was for a period the General Secretary of the MGK. Because of her daddies job she grew up and was schooled in; Switzerland, Holland, Greece and Türkiye, at the French schools in those countries. She graduated in 1997 in Ankara from the "Lycee Charles De Gaulle". In her senior year in highschool she worked with Rüştü Asyalı ad the "Lir Müzik ve Sahne Sanatları" school.

She studied in the US at the University of Massachusetts – Amherst (UMASS) at the Theater and Communications department, and in 1999 went on student exchange to London "Goldsmiths College".

After graduating she went to London again in 2001 and in 2002 attended the LAMDAs (London Academy of Music and Dramatic Arts) 8-week Shakespeare workshop and after, entered into the examinations and was selected. In 2004 she graduated from the LAMDA. In 2004 she married Tom Harvey. The thespian who still lives in London presently, speaks English, French, Spanish and Greek to a good degree according to herself.

Plays she was in 

 2007 –  Heroes  (Leading role)  – National Theatre
 2009 –  The Recognition of Sakuntala  (Leading role)  – The Union Theatre
 2009 – Who Will Carry the Word (Leading role)  – Courtyard Theatre

Movies and TV shows she was in 

 2013 – Ben Onu Çok Sevdim ( Berrin Menderes' assistant Canan) (TV)
 2014 – Unutma Beni İstanbul (Movie)
 2014 – Atatürk (Movie)
 2014 – Çakallarla Dans 3: Sıfır Sıkıntı (Movie)
 2016 – Naciye (Movie)
 2022– Aldatmak (TV)

Sources 

Turkish film actresses
Turkish stage actresses
1979 births
Living people